Comfort is the physical and psychological sense of ease.

Comfort may also refer to:

Places 
Comfort, North Carolina
Comfort, Texas
Comfort, West Virginia
Comfort, Wisconsin
Comfort Lake, a lake in Minnesota
Comfort Township, Minnesota
Old Point Comfort, Virginia
Point Comfort, Texas

People 
A. B. Comfort, an American politician
Alex Comfort (1920–2000), a British medical professional, anarchist, pacifist, and writer
Anna Manning Comfort (1845-1931), an American physician
Charles Comfort (1900–1994), a Canadian painter, sculptor, teacher, writer, and administrator
Lance Comfort (1908–1966), an English film director
Nathaniel C. Comfort, an American historian
Pat Comfort, an American politician
Ray Comfort (born 1949), a New Zealand-born minister and evangelist
Comfort Freeman, a Liberian Lutheran activist
Comfort Jones, a character on UK TV show Casualty
Louis Comfort Tiffany (1848–1933), an American artist and designer
Comfort Tyler (1764-1827), one of the original settlers of modern Syracuse, New York

Arts, entertainment, and media
Comfort (Failure album)
Comfort (magazine), an American mail-order periodical 1888–1942
Comfort (Maya Jane Coles album)
Comfort (Splashh album)
"Comfort", a song by Basement from their album Colourmeinkindness (2012)
"Comfort", a song by Deb Talan
Comfort Women: A New Musical, a musical about Korean comfort women, written and directed by Dimo Hyun Jun Kim

Brands and enterprises
Comfort (fabric softener)
Comfort, a taxi company under ComfortDelGro 
Comfort Inn, a hospitality company owned by Choice Hotels International, Inc. 
Southern Comfort (often abbreviated SoCo), an American whiskey liqueur with fruit and spice accents
Toyota Comfort, a taxicab popular in Japan and Hong Kong

Ships
MDL Comfort, a container ship; one of the biggest shipwrecks ever
 (1917–1921)
 (1943–1946)
USNS Comfort (T-AH-20) (1975–)

Other uses
Comfort food, food that has a nostalgic or sentimental value, and may be characterized by its high caloric nature, high carbohydrate level, or simple preparation 
Comfort noise, the artificial background noise used in radio and wireless communications to fill the silent time in a transmission
Comfort object, an object used to provide psychological comfort
Comfort women, a euphemism for women who were forced to work as sex slaves in Japanese-occupied countries during World War II
Comfort zone, the term used to denote a type of mental conditioning resulting in artificially created mental boundaries, within which an individual derives a sense of security
Consolation, psychological comfort
Thermal comfort, a field of specialization in building indoor environment

See also
ComfortDelGro Australia
Comforter (disambiguation)